Ossian Sars Nature Reserve is located at the inner-most part of Kongsfjorden on Spitsbergen in Svalbard, Norway. It was created on 26 September 2003 to preserve the mountain Ossian Sarsfjellet and the surrounding vegetation, although it had been protected as a plant conservatory area in 1984 The nature reserve covers 12.139 square kilometers. Hiking is permitted, but tenting is not.

The mountain and reserve are named after biologist Georg Ossian Sars.

References

Nature reserves in Svalbard
Protected areas established in 2003
2003 establishments in Norway
Spitsbergen